The , or Bun'ei Campaign, also known as the First Battle of Hakata Bay, was the first attempt by the Mongol-led Yuan dynasty of China to invade Japan. After conquering the Japanese settlements on Tsushima and Iki islands, Kublai Khan's fleet moved on to Japan proper and landed at Hakata Bay, a short distance from Kyūshū's administrative capital of Dazaifu. Despite the superior weapons and tactics of the Yuan forces, those that disembarked at Hakata Bay were grossly outnumbered by the samurai force; the Japanese had been preparing, mobilizing warriors and reinforcing defenses since they heard of the defeats at Tsushima and Iki. The Japanese defenders were aided by major storms which sunk a sizable portion of the Yuan fleets. Ultimately, the invasion attempt was decisively repulsed shortly after the initial landings.

The Yuan troops withdrew and took refuge on their ships after only one day of fighting.  A typhoon that night, said to be divinely conjured wind, threatened their ships, persuading them to return to Korea. Many of the returning ships sank that night due to the storm.

The battle
After landing in the bay, the Yuan force quickly overran the town of Hakata (now a ward of Fukuoka), but were engaged by a number of samurai soon afterwards.

At first, the samurai were hopelessly outmatched; accustomed to smaller scale clan rivalries, they could not match the organization and massed firepower of the invaders. Yuan forces fought with precision, loosing heavy volleys of arrows into the ranks of the Japanese. The Yuan also employed an early form of rocket artillery, and their infantry used phalanx-like tactics, holding off the samurai with their shields and spears. Though unable to conclusively defeat the Yuan forces, the Japanese fought hard and inflicted heavy casualties.

In the course of the day's fighting, the Hakozaki Shrine was burned to the ground.

Despite their initial victories, the Yuan did not pursue the samurai further inland to the defenses at Dazaifu.   Nihon Ōdai Ichiran explains that the invaders were defeated because they lacked arrows.

More likely this was a result of their unfamiliarity with the terrain, the expectation of Japanese reinforcements, and the heavy losses already suffered. The Yuan forces, which may have intended to carry out a reconnaissance in force rather than an immediate invasion, returned to their ships. That night, the Yuan lost roughly one-third of their force in a typhoon. They retreated back to Korea, presumably at the prodding of their sailors and captains, rather than regrouping and continuing their attack.

Main Battles of Battle of Bun'ei

Battle of Tsushima Island - Yuan victory 
On November 4, about 1,000 soldiers of the Mongol Army landed on Komoda Beach. Sō Sukekuni (宗助国), Shugodai of Tsushima Island was killed in action.
Mongolians slaughtered dwellers of Tsushima.

Battle of Iki Island - Yuan victory 
On November 13, Taira no Kagetaka (平景隆), Shugodai of Iki led about 100 soldiers. They were defeated by the Mongolian army, and Shugodai committed suicide in Hinotsume Castle (樋詰城). About 1,000 Japanese soldiers were killed there.

Battle of Hirato Island, Taka Island and Nokono Island - Yuan victory 
On November 15 to 16, Mongolian army attacked the base of Sashi Clan. Hundreds of Japanese soldiers and Sashi Fusashi (佐志房), Sashi Tomaru (佐志留) and Sashi Isamu (佐志勇)
were killed.

Battle of Akasaka - Japanese victory 

Mongolian Army landed on Sawara District and encamped in Akasaka. On seeing this situation, Kikuchi Takefusa (菊池武房) surprised the Mongolian army.
The Mongols escaped to Sohara, and they lost about 100 soldiers.

Battle of Torikai-Gata - Japanese victory 

Thousands of Mongolian soldiers were awaiting in Torikai-Gata. Takezaki Suenaga (竹崎季長), one of the Japanese commanders, assaulted the Mongolian army and fought them.
Soon, reinforcements by Shiraishi Michiyasu (白石通泰) arrived there and defeated the Mongolians. The Mongolian casualties of this battle are estimated at around 3,500.

Withdrawal of Yuan army 
Due to the defeat in the battle of Torikai-Gata, the Yuan army was exhausted. So they withdrew to their own ships. On seeing this situation, the Japanese army did night attacks and killed many soldiers.
Finally, Hong Dagu decided to withdraw to Yuan dynasty. In the midst of the withdrawal, they met a typhoon, most of their ships sank and  many soldiers drowned.

See also
Battle of Kōan - the second invasion attempt by Kublai Khan, in 1281.
Mongol invasions of Japan

Notes

References

 Davis, Paul K. (1999).  100 Decisive Battles: From Ancient Times to the Present. Oxford: Oxford University Press. ; 
 Titsingh, Isaac. (1834). Nihon Odai Ichiran; ou,  Annales des empereurs du Japon.  Paris: Royal Asiatic Society, Oriental Translation Fund of Great Britain and Ireland. OCLC 5850691
 Turnbull, Stephen R. (2003).  Genghis Khan and the Mongol Conquests, 1190-1400. London: Taylor & Francis. 

1270s in Japan
1274 in Asia
Bun'ei 1274
Bun'ei 1274
Bun'ei 1274
Bun'ei 1274
Wars involving Imperial China
Bun'ei
13th century in Korea
1274 in the Mongol Empire